Yuka Orihara (born 26 June 2000) is a Japanese ice dancer who competes for Finland. With her current partner, Juho Pirinen, she is the 2019–20 Finnish national champion.

Career 
Orihara was born on 26 June 2000 in Tokyo, Japan. She formerly competed for Japan with Kanata Mori, placing 4th at the 2017-18 Japan national championships. They were assigned to the 2018 Mentor Toruń Cup, where they finished in 11th place.

From 2018 to 2019, Orihara skated with Lee Royer for Canada. They placed 5th on the junior level at 2019 Canadian championships.

Orihara teamed up with Juho Pirinen to represent Finland, making their international debut at the Lombardia Trophy in September 2019.

Programs

With Pirinen

Competitive highlights
GP: Grand Prix; CS: Challenger Series

With Pirinen

With Royer

With Mori

Women's Singles

References

External links 
 

Japanese female ice dancers
Finnish female ice dancers
Sportspeople from Tokyo
2000 births
Living people